Apatema lucidum is a moth of the family Autostichidae. It is found on the Canary Islands.

The wingspan is 13–14 mm. The forewings are pale ochreous, partially shaded with umber-brown. The hindwings are pale straw-whitish.

References

Moths described in 1908
Apatema
Moths of Africa